Mojmír Božík (born 26 February 1962) is a Slovak former ice hockey player. He competed in the men's tournament at the 1988 Winter Olympics.

Career statistics

Regular season and playoffs

International

References

External links

1962 births
Living people
Anglet Hormadi Élite players
Ducs de Dijon players
HK Dukla Michalovce players
HK Dukla Trenčín players
Ice hockey players at the 1988 Winter Olympics
Jokerit players
Kokkolan Hermes players
HC Košice players
MHk 32 Liptovský Mikuláš players
Mora IK players
Olympic ice hockey players of Czechoslovakia
HK Poprad players
HC Prešov players
Hockey Club de Reims players
Czechoslovak ice hockey defencemen
Slovak ice hockey defencemen
Sportspeople from Liptovský Mikuláš
Edmonton Oilers draft picks